Åge Aleksandersen (born 21 March 1949 in Namsos, Norway) is a Norwegian singer, songwriter and guitarist. He is one of his country's best known singer/songwriters and  musicians.
Some of his most well known songs are "Lys og varme" (Light and Warmth), "Fire pils og en pizza" (Four Pilseners and a Pizza) and "Rosalita". 

He also wrote and performed the official song of the 1997 Nordic skiing World Championship (held in Trondheim) together with two other musicians from the region, Ulf Risnes and Bjarne Brøndbo and the Nidaros Cathedral Boys' Choir. The song was called "Snørosa" (The Snowrose). 

Aleksandersen has sold almost 1.5 million copies of his many albums in Norway alone.

Discography

Albums
As a member of Prudence
1972: Tomorrow May Be Vanished
1973: Drunk and Happy
1974: No. 3
1975: Takk te dokk
1976: 11/12-75

Solo albums
1975: 7800 Namsos (7500 copies sold)
1976: Mot i brystet, mord i blikket, Bomben und Granaten (3000)
1977: Lirekassa (15000)
1979: French only  (30000)
1980: Ramp (60000)
1981: Mølje og sodd (75000) - Note: this was a cassette-only release featuring 8 tracks as well as some comedy skits in which Aleksandersen did not perform. Since the cassettes were poor quality, and this type of cassette is intended for car listening, this is an extreme rarity today.
1982: Dains me mæ (80000) - Note: double album, one studio album, one live. Also features the short song "Saturday Cowboys", actua rumpe! to the so named new wave group when Aleksandersen was a guest host on a music show on Norwegian TV.
1984: Levva livet (275000) - Note: cassette version features an additional instrumental version of the song "Café Farvel".
1984: Lys og varme (80000)
1985: Ljus och värme (50000) - Swedish language version of Lys og varme
1986: Eldorado (260000)
1989: Solregn (160000)
1990: Sanger (best of) (10000)
1991: Laika (45000)
1993: Din dag (65000)
1995: Med hud og hår (65000)
1997: Snørosa - Note: with Ulf Risnes, Bjarne Brøndbo and Nidaros Cathedral Boys' Choir
1997: Fredløs - Dylan på norsk (15000) - Note: Outlaw - Bob Dylan in Norwegian
1999: Flyg avsted (55000)
2000: Gamle ørn (35000)
2001: Åge Original (30000)
2002: Linedans (45000)
2005: To skritt fram
2006: Snöharpan
2008: Katalysator
2011: Furet værbitt
2014: Sukker og Salt

EPs
2010: Big-5: Åge Aleksandersen (2010)

Live albums
2005: 4 skritt tilbake (live album from the 2004 tour)
2016: De e langt å gå til Royal Albert Hall

Singles
1976: "Mot i brystet, mord i blikket, bomben und granaten/Båtvise"
1977: "Positivet"
1979: "The Pacifier/14 Pages"
1980: "Bjørnen sover/Stanga haue i væggen"
1981: "Kom  bli med mæ no i natt/Blått hav"
1984: "Lys og varme"
1985: "Ljus och värme/Fyra öl och en pizza" (Swedish version)
1991: "Akkurat no"
1993: "Min dag/Stormen"
1994: "Fire pils og en pizza"
1995: "Med hud og hår"
1997: "Æ vil ha dæ"
2000: "Myggen"
2005: "To skritt frem"
2005: "Alkymisten"
2005: "Danserinnen"
2006: "Jag har drömt"
2007: "Sommernatt"
2008: "Janne Ahonens smil"
2011: "Medvind"

With other artists
Mitt lille land (2011)

External links 
Levvalivet.no - Official site (in Norwegian)

1949 births
Living people
Melodi Grand Prix contestants
Spellemannprisen winners
Norwegian rock guitarists
Norwegian male guitarists
Norwegian male singers
Norwegian songwriters
Norwegian-language singers
English-language singers from Norway
Musicians from Namsos